Golag is a township in the northeast of Zayü County, Nyingchi, in the southeast of the Tibet Autonomous Region.

See also
List of towns and villages in Tibet

References

Populated places in Tibet